Joseph House may refer to:

Joseph House (Columbus, Georgia), listed on the National Register of Historic Places listings in Muscogee County, Georgia
Joseph Joseph House, Iron River, Michigan, listed on the National Register of Historic Places
Joseph-Cherrington House, listed on the National Register of Historic Places listings in Columbus, Ohio
Lyman C. Joseph House, Middletown, Rhode Island, listed on the National Register of Historic Places